Scott Davie may refer to:
Scott Davie (broadcaster), football commentator
Scott Davie (pianist) (born 1966), Australian pianist
Scott Davie (basketball), Australian basketball player
Scott Davey, rugby player on List of Parramatta Eels players

See also
Scott Davies (disambiguation)